Eupithecia fulviplagiata is a moth in the  family Geometridae. It is found in Guatemala.

References

Moths described in 1907
fulviplagiata
Moths of Central America